Game is a 2006 Telugu-language slice-of-life drama film directed by Ramprasad G. It stars Mohan Babu and Vishnu Manchu in lead roles with Shobana, Parvati Melton, Sumalatha and Giri Babu in supporting roles. The film's background score and soundtrack were composed by music composer, Joshua Sridhar. The soundtrack for the movie was released on 27 July 2006. The movie is based on Hollywood Movie Changing Lanes which was remade in three Indian languages, Taxi No. 9211 (2006) in Hindi, TN-07 AL 4777 (2009) in Tamil and this movie itself in Telugu. Unlike the previous versions, Game received negative reviews and failed at the box office. The film marked Shobana's return to Telugu films almost after a decade and eventually, this film ended up being her last Telugu film to date.

Cast 

 Mohan Babu as Pandit Raghava, Taxi driver
 Vishnu Manchu as Vijay Raj
 Shobana as Uma, Pandit Raghava's wife
 Parvati Melton as Swetha, Vijay Raj's partner
 Sunil as Kulkarni, bank employee
 Giri Babu as Rama Chandra Murthy
 Shriya Saran as Vijay Raj's girlfriend (Special Appearance)
 Brahmanandam as Raghava's boss
 Posani Krishna Murali as Raghava's ex boss
 Raghu Babu as Police Officer
 Satyam Rajesh as Inspector Subba Rao
 Subbaraju as Police Officer
 Ravi Prakash as Vijay Raj's friend
 Tanikella Bharani as Lawyer
 Harsha Vardhan as a person with whose vehicle Raghava's vehicle meets an accident
 Sumalatha as Judge

Soundtrack 
Music by Joshua Sridhar.
"Ataladukundam" - Karthik, Balaji, Joshua Sridhar
"Uyyale Uyyale" - Karthik, Balaji, Joshua Sridhar
"Ata Modalaindi" - Joshua Sridhar
"Uyyale Uyyale" - Karthik, Suchitra, Joshua Sridhar
"Nee Thone Nuvvu" - S. P. Balasubrahmanyam, Joshua Sridhar
"Masthu Mega City" - Karthik, Joshua Sridhar

External links

References

2006 films
2000s Telugu-language films
Indian remakes of American films
Telugu remakes of Hindi films
Films scored by Joshua Sridhar